Julienne Taylor (born Julie Anne Taylor on 15 July 1981) is a Scottish singer and songwriter who has been hailed as "Scotland’s best female voice since Annie Lennox". Her beautiful voice creates gorgeous music both traditional and contemporary performed with a Scottish flavour.

Julienne Taylor's enchanting and captivating voice has been compared to both Norah Jones and Eva Cassidy but has her own unique and distinctive style influenced by her Scottish ancestry.

Early life
Julienne, daughter of Andrew and Jane, was born in Falkirk, Scotland and raised in the surrounding Stirlingshire area.

Family gatherings were often a musical affair during her early upbringing, but it would be sport that would ignite Julienne's passion in her early childhood. This would be something to which she would return to following a serious car crash in which she damaged her back, resulting in her taking constant pain relief medication for an approximate 18-month period. Julienne would determine to successfully remedy this through exercise, which would later see her qualify as a personal fitness trainer and Pilates instructor.

While at high school Julienne would regularly make trips to London to visit friends and attend gigs at the world famous Marquee Club in Wardour Street. A few years later she would spend many more nights at this venue, while working for a Shepperton Studios based sound and lighting company who provided engineers and equipment to this venue.

Musical career
Taylor played in various bands during high school and studied dance and expressive mime in Edinburgh. She moved to London to pursue a career in music and worked at Shepperton Studios as backing vocalist. A serious car crash causing multiple injuries forced her to pursue a career in studio engineering career.

Her first album was named Racing the Clouds Home in homage to Marillion, the words coming from the song White Russian on their album Clutching at Straws.

In 2001, whilst working with an Edinburgh based independent label, and following a series of successful live performances at the Edinburgh Festival, Julienne was signed to Virgin Records. In 2008 she signed to Hong Kong based Evolution Ltd. on their evosound label. She recorded a new album in Edinburgh, Scotland in between October and December 2010. The album was produced by Stuart Wood and Gordon Campbell the production team responsible for her previous album releases.

Julienne's debut headline concert took place on 24 September at the Lyric Theatre – The Hong Kong Academy for Performing Arts featuring The Celtic Connection. The concert was released in CD in late 2012 and on DVD and Blu-ray in late 2013. Julienne returned to Asia for concerts with the legendary folk singer Judy Collins on 2 September 2013 at The Sun Yat-sen Memorial Hall (Taipei) and 3 September 2013 at the Y-Theatre, Hong Kong.

South East Asia

South Korea
The song "Love Hurts" from her album Music Garden, became a regularly played song on South Korean radio and together with a promotional drive on TV, advertising billboards and magazines the Music Garden album sold well. When asked by the Daily Record newspaper in Scotland about her success in Korea Julie said "It's fantastic but I still find it incredibly bizarre. I don't even know what type of music people listen to in South Korea but it must be similar to the stuff I do."

The release of her album A Time For Love in 2008 sold over 10,000 CD's in S.E. Asia with strong sales in Hong Kong, Taiwan, Singapore, Indonesia and Thailand. Julienne's debut live performance in S.E. Asia took place as the special guest to John Ford Coley at the Shouson Theatre, Hong Kong on 19 June 2009.

The Heart Within
The new album, The Heart Within, of new wave & classic love songs and original songs co-written with producers Gordon Campbell and Stuart Wood was released in Hong Kong on 29 July 2011. Her debut headline concert was also announced to take place on 24 September 2011 at the Lyric Theatre, The Hong Kong Academy for Performing Arts, Hong Kong.

When We Are One
In When We Are One, Julienne Taylor gave all of her love to the world through her touching voice with fresh and traditional Celtic favor. In this album, She recorded with Italian guitarist Daniele Ferretti and border pipes artist Fraser Fifield again in Italy, US and UK. It included three original songs which composed by Julienne Taylor and Daniele Ferretti "Toybox","Dancing for The Oceans", "Umbrellas in The Rain". The project was recorded, mixed, mastered in 96khz/24bit with the producer Marco Di Giangiacomo in Italy and released on CD and SACD format. she successfully created her unique feeling and style in this album.

Personal life
Taylor resides near Bath in the South West of England.

Discography

Singles

Soundtracks

See also
Caledonia
Beverley Lyons

References

External links
 Julienne Taylor's Official Website
 evosound.com

21st-century Scottish women singers
Living people
People from Falkirk
Scottish singer-songwriters
1991 births